|}

The Denny Cordell Lavarack Fillies Stakes is a Group 3 flat horse race in Ireland open to thoroughbred fillies and mares aged three years or older. It is run at Gowran Park over a distance of 1 mile, 1 furlong and 100 yards (1,902 metres), and it is scheduled to take place each year in late September.

History
The event is named in memory of Denny Cordell-Lavarack (1943–95), an English record producer who became a racehorse trainer in Ireland. It was created by his family and friends, the sponsors of the race, in celebration of his life.

The race was established in 1996, and it was initially held in mid-September. It was switched to mid-October and given Listed status in 2000. It moved to August in 2004.

The race was promoted to Group 3 level in 2006 and renamed the Denny Cordell Fillies Stakes, after Cordell-Lavarack's shortened name. It returned to October the following year, and from this point it was jointly sponsored by Lanwades Stud. It has taken place in late September since 2008, from which date it reverted to its original name.

Records
Most successful horse:
 no horse has won this race more than once

Leading jockey (4 wins):
 Johnny Murtagh – Darrouzett (1997), Renge (1998), Livadiya (2003), Mango Diva (2013)

Leading trainer (5 wins):
 John Oxx – Darrouzett (1997), Renge (1998), Julie Jalouse (2001), Timarwa (2007), Shareen (2010)

Winners

See also
 Horse racing in Ireland
 List of Irish flat horse races

References

 Racing Post:

 galopp-sieger.de – Denny Cordell Fillies Stakes.
 horseracingintfed.com – International Federation of Horseracing Authorities – Denny Cordell Lavarack & Lanwades Stud Fillies Stakes (2017).
 pedigreequery.com – Denny Cordell Fillies Stakes – Gowran Park.

Flat races in Ireland
Mile category horse races for fillies and mares
Recurring sporting events established in 1996
Gowran Park Racecourse